1001 Things You Should Know is a British game show that aired on Channel 4 from 12 November 2012 to 31 May 2013 and hosted by Sandi Toksvig.

Format
Three contestants compete in each show. They are offered a choice of 12 categories, and in each category, an expert (either a celebrity from a Channel 4 show or just a field expert) asks them a question, the answer of which it is thought people 'should know'. There is no prize money awarded for answering this question correctly, but the contestant can then answer a (harder) related cash question for money. Wrong answers lock a contestant out of the game, and the question is open to 'steals'.

In round one, correct answers to the cash question are worth £100. In round two, with fewer categories left to choose from, correct answers are worth £300, whilst in round three they are worth £601.

The categories include: Film, Geography, Music, Celebrity, Sport, Art, Food & Drink, History, Television, Human Body, Science, Nature, Maths, Politics, Animals and Mystery. (The Mystery category is the only category that appears on every show.)

Final round
The final round involves the three categories the contestants have thus far avoided, and the player in the lead gets the first choice of category. The player in 3rd place answers first, and must correctly answer 2 questions, the first of which is the one they should know. An incorrect answer to either puts them out of the game. However, if the leading player gets both questions correctly, they'll automatically win the game even if other players have also answered correctly. If no-one answers both questions correctly in the final round, then, there is no returning champion, and 3 new contestants will compete in the next show instead.

In Series 2, this was altered, as instead of all 3 contestants picking their categories, only the person who banked the most money picks which category everybody gets.

The winner of the game gets the chance to answer a single question in order to win the entire prize pot built up by the 3 contestants. If this question is not answered correctly, the prize pot rolls over to the next show. The champion from each show returns for the following show to compete against two new contestants, regardless of whether they win the jackpot or not.

Category Experts

Series 1

Series 2

Transmissions

References

External links

2012 British television series debuts
2013 British television series endings
2010s British game shows
Channel 4 game shows
Television shows produced by Thames Television
Television series by Fremantle (company)
English-language television shows